Charles William Tollefson (February 28, 1917 – August 20, 1989) was an American football player.  He played his entire career with the Green Bay Packers, winning one World Championship.  Prior to joining the Packers, Tollefson attended the University of Iowa.

External links 
 

Tollefson, Charles
Tollefson, Charles
Players of American football from South Dakota
Tollefson, Charles
Tollefson, Charles
Tollefson, Charles
People from Elk Point, South Dakota